Malassezia caprae is a fungus first isolated in goats, which can cause opportunistic infections in animals. Its type strain is MA383=CBS 10434. This species will not grow without any lipid supplementation. It grows slowly and forms small colonies (average diameter ). In the lab, colonies will not grow at temperatures of 40 °C, differing from M. sympodialis-related species, such M. dermatis and  M. nana, which can grow at this temperature. Malassezia caprae cells are ellipsoidal to more or less spherical.

References

Further reading

Basidiomycota
Parasitic fungi
Yeasts
Fungi described in 2007